This is a list of regencies and city in Bengkulu province. As of October 2019, there were 9 regencies and 1 city.

External links 

 
 
Bengkulu
Regencies and cities